Frank Moore (born 1946 in Bay de Verde, Newfoundland) is a Canadian film, television and stage actor. He won the Canadian Film Award for Best Supporting Actor in 1976 for the film The Far Shore, and was also a nominee for Best Actor in 1978 for The Third Walker.

Career 
Moore has appeared in the films The Long Kiss Goodnight, Murder at 1600, Giant Mine, The Sleep Room, Dirty Pictures, Owning Mahowny, Martha, Ruth and Edie, Jesus Henry Christ and From the Vine, and the television series Adderly, Katts and Dog, Night Heat, The Campbells, Street Legal, E.N.G., Due South, Earth: Final Conflict, The Reagans, At the Hotel, Killjoys and Murdoch Mysteries.

On stage, his noted roles have included productions of the musicals Hair, Les Misérables, Tommy, The Drowsy Chaperone and Urinetown, and the plays Creeps, Leaving Home, The Crackwalker and Russell Hill.

Filmography

Film

Television

References

External links

1946 births
Canadian male film actors
Canadian male television actors
Canadian male voice actors
Canadian male stage actors
Canadian male musical theatre actors
Male actors from Newfoundland and Labrador
Best Supporting Actor Genie and Canadian Screen Award winners
Living people